Fioravanti may refer to:
 Fioravanti (surname), a family name and persons with it
 Fioravanti (automotive), a design studio
 Fioravanti (soft drink), a soft drink
Fioravanti. A noble family originating in Pistoia, Tuscany, Italy. King Anthony John Fioravanti was first Leader of this family